Roberto Carlos Mario Gómez (born 27 February 1957 in Mar del Plata) is an Argentine football manager and former player.

Gómez has been known as Roberto Gómez during his playing career and as Mario Gómez during his coaching career.

Playing career
Gómez started playing in 1979 for Club Atlético Kimberley de Mar del Plata. in 1980 he was signed for Ferro Carril Oeste by manager Carlos Timoteo Griguol. Gómez played through Ferro's glory years in the 1980s, helping the side to win two Nacional championships in 1982 and 1984.

Gómez made 135 appearances for Ferro between 1980 and 1987.

Coaching career
After retiring as a player, in 1995 Gómez  initially became Héctor Cúper's assistant at Club Atlético Lanús, and when Cúper left to join Mallorca in Spain, Gómez took over as manager and surprisingly led the club to its second Copa CONMEBOL final in a row, eventually losing to Atlético Mineiro.
In 1998, he also ended up at 2nd place in the Clausura. 

In the summer of 1999, Gómez took over as manager of Mallorca. He failed to qualify for the UEFA Champions League group stage, losing to Molde FK on the away goal rule, eventually retreating to the UEFA Cup. Complessively he was only in charge for 14 games (3 wins, 4 draws, 7 defeats) and he was heavily criticized due to its defensive style.

Gómez then resumed his position as Cúper's assistant at Valencia and then Inter Milan.

In 2004, Gómez returned to Argentina to take over as manager of Gimnasia de La Plata where he famously said "fútbol argentino lo gobiernan los hinchas" (football in Argentina is governed by the fans).

In December 2004, he took over at Gimnasia y Esgrima de Jujuy, guiding them to the 2nd place in the 2nd division and conseguent promotion to Primera División. The next season, he reached with Gimnasia a 4th-place finish in the Clausura 2006.

In 2006, Gómez joined struggling Quilmes but could not turn the club's fortunes around, failing to win any of his six games in charge. Gómez then returned to Gimnasia de Jujuy.

In June 2009, Mario Gómez agreed to sign a contract as a manager with Greek team Asteras Tripolis. A new team with high ambitions and many Argentine players. On 9 March 2010, Last-place Club Atlético Tucumán officials sacked Osvaldo Sosa and replaced him with the former Asteras Tripolis coach. Gómez was able to take the team from nearly the relegation zone to the 5th place at the end of the season, then resigned his contract. 

In July 2011, Gómez rejoined for the third time Gimnasia de Jujuy as manager. 

In 2013, Gómez was confirmed as the new coach of Ecuador's Deportivo Cuenca, managing to win the 2014 Lunar New Year Cup in Hong Kong.

At the end of 2014, South China convener Wallace Cheung announced that Mario Gómez has taken over as the club's new manager, replacing Yeung Ching Kwong.

Between 2015 and 2017, Gómez led the Johor Darul Ta'zim F.C. and won the Super League Malaysia in 2015 and 2016. He has also managed to reach the final of the 2015 AFC Cup and win it, thus Johor Darul Ta'zim F.C. becomes the first ٍSoutheast Asian team in history to win that competition. He was awarded as the best coach in Malaysia in 2015.

Gómez has also managed to win the Malaysia FA Cup and the Charity Shield Malaysia in 2016.

In March 2017, he was initially appointed as the Malaysian national football team's head coach by Football Association of Malaysia president Tunku Ismail Sultan Ibrahim, but he then asked for a higher salary and was therefore rejected.

in November 2017, Persib Bandung confirmed sign Gómez to be Head coach, who have been searching for a long-term replacement for Djajang Nurdjaman.

Gómez started a court battle against JDT due to unpaid wages. JDT's president Tunku Ismail Ibrahim denied the allegations and hit back over claims.

Honours

Player
Ferro Carril Oeste
 Primera División: 1982 Nacional, 1984 Nacional

Manager
Lanús
 Clausura runner-up: 1998 
 Copa CONMEBOL runner-up: 1997
Gymnasia y Esgrima de Jujuy
 Primera B Nacional runner-up: 2005 (Promotion to Primera División)
Deportivo Cuenca
 Lunar New Year Cup: 2014
Johor Darul Ta'zim
 Malaysia Super League: 2015, 2016
 Malaysia FA Cup: 2016
 Piala Sumbangsih: 2016
 AFC Cup: 2015

References

External links

1957 births
Living people
Sportspeople from Mar del Plata
Argentine footballers
Association football defenders
Ferro Carril Oeste footballers
Argentine football managers
Argentine expatriate football managers
Club Atlético Lanús managers
RCD Mallorca managers
Club de Gimnasia y Esgrima La Plata managers
Gimnasia y Esgrima de Jujuy managers
Quilmes Atlético Club managers
Club Atlético Belgrano managers
Atlético Tucumán managers
Ferro Carril Oeste managers
C.D. Cuenca managers
South China AA managers
Persib Bandung managers
Expatriate football managers in Ecuador
AFC Cup winning managers
Inter Milan non-playing staff